The Uzbekistan "National Revival" Democratic Party (OʻzMTDP), simply known as Milliy Tiklanish, is a national-conservative political party in Uzbekistan. It is allied with the Liberal Democratic Party of Uzbekistan, the country's ruling party.

The party is one of the country's five officially sanctioned political parties along with the People's Democratic Party of Uzbekistan, the Uzbekistan Liberal Democratic Party, the Justice Social Democratic Party. and the Ecological Party of Uzbekistan.

History 

The party was formed in 1995 with a largely intellectual membership and has a comparatively high proportion of female members. The party advocates a strong sense of Uzbek culture, desiring a cultural revival, whilst also seeking to build closer links with other states in Central Asia. The party opposes the influence of Russia in the region and attacked the foundation of the Eurasian Economic Community on this basis.

The party announced its intention to merge with the Self-Sacrifice National Democratic Party in 2008, as the two parties shared common goals. The new group has retained the National Revival Democratic Party name.

Electoral history 
In the 2004–05 Uzbek parliamentary election, the party won 11 out of 120 seats. The party's candidate for the 2007 Uzbek presidential election was Hurshid Dustmuhammad.

Presidential elections

Legislative Chamber elections

References

Bibliography 
 

Political parties in Uzbekistan
Political parties established in 1995
Uzbekistani nationalism